The following television stations broadcast on digital channel 17 in Mexico:

 XEFE-TDT in Nuevo Laredo, Tamaulipas
 XHAH-TDT on Cerro de las Lajas, Veracruz
 XHAPT-TDT in Agua Prieta, Sonora
 XHBQ-TDT in Zacatecas, Zacatecas
 XHCBO-TDT in Caborca, Sonora
 XHCC-TDT in Colima, Colima
 XHCCG-TDT in Celaya, Guanajuato
 XHCTME-TDT in Mexicali, Baja California
 XHDUH-TDT in Durango, Durango
 XHENJ-TDT in Ensenada, Baja California
 XHFN-TDT in Monterrey, Nuevo León
 XHGO-TDT in Tampico, Tamaulipas
 XHNOS-TDT in Nogales, Sonora
 XHPBSA-TDT in Saltillo, Coahuila
 XHSNC-TDT in San Cristóbal de las Casas, Chiapas
 XHSQP-TDT in Sinoquipe, Sonora

17